Lorneville, formerly the Village of Pisarinco (1854-1902)***, (2006 estimated pop.: 800) is a small Canadian coastal community located in the western part of Saint John County, New Brunswick.

Lorneville  Honours the Marquess of Lorne (1845-1914)**, Governor General from 1878 to 1883.

It is located within the boundaries of the city of Saint John.

Notable people

See also
List of neighbourhoods in New Brunswick

References
 
 Geographical Names of Canada - Lorneville

Neighbourhoods in Saint John, New Brunswick

 Provincial Archives of New Brunswick - Place Names of New Brunswick - Where is Home? New Brunswick Communities Past and Present